David Bodanis is an American speaker, business advisor and writer of bestselling nonfiction books, notably E=mc2: A Biography of the World's Most Famous Equation, which was translated into 26 languages. Originally from Chicago, he received an undergraduate education in mathematics, physics and economics at the University of Chicago (AB 1977). He lived in France for ten years from his early twenties and has since been based in London.

Early life and education
Bodanis was born and brought up in Chicago, Illinois, and read mathematics, physics and history at the University of Chicago. In his early twenties he moved to Paris, where he began his career as a foreign correspondent for the International Herald Tribune. A move to the South of France followed, and he then split his time between France and London, combining writing with stints as a science presenter on 1980s ITV show, the Wide Awake Club.

Bodanis moved to the UK full-time in the late 1980s, combining writing with teaching social sciences at St Antony's College, Oxford, consulting for the Royal Dutch Shell Scenario Prediction unit, and speaking engagements including at conferences and Davos.

Works
In 1986, Bodanis had his first commercial authorial success with The Secret House: 24 Hours in the Strange & Wonderful World in Which We Spend Our Nights and Days, which reached no 5 on The New York Times Best Seller list and established him as a popular science writer. This book introduces Bodanis’s "microphotography" writing style, in which the author takes a worm's-eye view perspective that allows him to observe many obscure and complex phenomena of everyday life.

In 2001, he published E=mc2: A Biography of the World's Most Famous Equation which was translated into 20 languages, and longlisted for the Samuel Johnson Prize for non-fiction. In 2005, it was made into a documentary for Channel 4, and aired on PBS under the name Einstein's Big Idea. In 2009, E=mc2 was made into a ballet by the Birmingham Royal Ballet, under director David Bintley, and won the South Bank Award for best British Dance of the year.

Electric Universe: How Electricity Switched on the Modern World followed in 2006, and won the Royal Society Prize for Best Science Book of the Year. Bodanis caused some controversy by pledging to donate his prize to the family of the late government scientist, Dr David Kelly.

In 2006, Bodanis published Passionate Minds, the story of a brilliant but forgotten French scientist, Émilie du Châtelet, and her intellectual love affair with Voltaire. Passionate Minds was the BBC’s Book of the Week on Radio 4 in June 2006, and featured on the cover of The Economist.

In 2013, Bodanis contributed an essay, "Computer-Generated Fascism" published in John Brockman's Edge Question series, What Should We Be Worried About? Real Scenarios That Keep Scientists Up at Night.

David's Einstein’s Greatest Mistake: The Life of a Flawed Genius was published September 2016. His essay appeared at NPR in December 2016.

In November 2020, David published The Art of Fairness: The Power of Decency in a World Turned Mean.

Awards
 2006: Electric Universe: How Electricity Switched on the Modern World – winner of Royal Society’s Science Book of the Year Prize
 2010: Sadlers’ Wells Premier of the ballet version of E=mc2 – winner of South Bank Show Award for Best New Dance

Personal life
Bodanis lives in London with his second wife and stepson. He has two children by a previous marriage. A keen kickboxer, he is a regular at Paragon Gym in Shoreditch, London, where he trains with champion kickboxing brothers, John and Stuart Lawson.

Bibliography

 

Bodanis, David (2020). The Art of Fairness: The Power of Decency in a World Turned Mean.

References

External links
 
 Bodanis’s page at Conville and Walsh literary agents
 Bodanis's page, JLA speaking agency
 Bodanis, David articles for The Guardian
 

American science writers
Living people
Year of birth missing (living people)
People from Chicago
International Herald Tribune people